Formby High School is an English secondary school with academy status located in the town of Formby, Merseyside. The local primary schools Freshfield, Redgate and Trinity St Peters act as feeder schools to Formby High.

History and administration
The school was officially opened in November 1938 and was re-opened in 1972 by Margaret Thatcher in her role as Secretary of State for Education and Science.

The school suffered with overcrowding in the 1970s, with ten-form entries at the school by 1971, each with over 30 pupils per class, resulting in conditional admissions being considered for 1972. To alleviate pressure, Sefton Education Authority offered temporary classrooms in 1974 which houses 200 students. By that time, the enrollment was 1,560 pupils which was expected to rise to 1,750 by September 1974. A new sixth form block, which was due to start construction around this time was expected to ease capacity constraints. Building work started on a new high school in April 1974, then known as Formby South High School, which had an expected capacity of 750 pupils and the potential to accommodate up to 1,050 pupils.

In 2002, the school was awarded specialist school status as an Arts College, which allows the school to apply for extra funding in this subject.

In 2004, its new sixth form building was opened by local MP Claire Curtis-Thomas.

Headed by D. A. Mackenzie, the school now accommodates over 1,000 students.

Notable former pupils
Angela Eagle, Labour MP and former minister
Maria Eagle, Labour MP and former minister 
Stacey Roca, actress

References

External links
 

Academies in the Metropolitan Borough of Sefton
Secondary schools in the Metropolitan Borough of Sefton
Formby
1938 establishments in England
Educational institutions established in 1938